In music theory, the scale degree is the position of a particular note on a scale relative to the tonic, the first and main note of the scale from which each octave is assumed to begin. Degrees are useful for indicating the size of intervals and chords and whether an interval is major or minor.

In the most general sense, the scale degree is the number given to each step of the scale, usually starting with 1 for tonic. Defining it like this implies that a tonic is specified. For instance, the 7-tone diatonic scale may become the major scale once the proper degree has been chosen as tonic (e.g. the C-major scale C–D–E–F–G–A–B, in which C is the tonic). If the scale has no tonic, the starting degree must be chosen arbitrarily. In set theory, for instance, the 12 degrees of the chromatic scale usually are numbered starting from C=0, the twelve pitch classes being numbered from 0 to 11.

In a more specific sense, scale degrees are given names that indicate their particular function within the scale (see table below). This implies a functional scale, as is the case in tonal music.

This example gives the names of the functions of the scale degrees in the seven note diatonic scale. The names are the same for the major and minor scales, only the seventh degree changes name when flattened:<ref>Benward & Saker (2003). Music: In Theory and Practice, vol. I, p p.32–33. Seventh Edition. . "Scale degree names: Each degree of the seven-tone diatonic scale has a name that relates to its function. The major scale and all three forms of the minor scale share these terms."</ref>

The term scale step is sometimes used synonymously with scale degree, but it may alternatively refer to the distance between two successive and adjacent scale degrees (see steps and skips). The terms "whole step" and "half step" are commonly used as interval names (though "whole scale step" or "half scale step" are not used). The number of scale degrees and the distance between them together define the scale they are in.

In Schenkerian analysis, "scale degree" (or "scale step") translates Schenker's German Stufe, denoting "a chord having gained structural significance" (see Schenkerian analysis#Harmony).

Major and minor scales
The degrees of the traditional major and minor scales may be identified several ways:
 by their ordinal numbers, as the first, second, third, fourth, fifth, sixth, or seventh degrees of the scale, sometimes raised or lowered;
 by Arabic numerals (1, 2, 3, 4 …), as in the Nashville Number System, sometimes with carets (…);
 by Roman numerals (I, II, III, IV …);
 by the English name for their function: tonic, supertonic, mediant, subdominant, dominant, submediant, subtonic or leading note (leading tone in the United States), and tonic again. These names are derived from a scheme where the tonic note is the 'centre'. Then the supertonic and subtonic are, respectively, a second above and below the tonic; the mediant and submediant are a third above and below it; and the dominant and subdominant are a fifth above and below the tonic:

The word subtonic is used when the interval between it and the tonic in the upper octave is a whole step; leading note is used when that interval is a half-step.
 by their name according to the movable do solfège system: do, re, mi, fa, so(l), la, and si (or ti'').

Scale degree names

See also
 Factor (chord)
 Ear training and music education

References